Tan Sri Datuk Seri Panglima Mohd Bakri bin Mohd Zinin (born 7 September 1954) was a former senior police officer who served as Deputy Inspector-General of Police.

Early life
Mohd Bakri Mohd Zinin was born on 7 September 1954 in Sabah.

Police career
Started service in the Police Force on 6 November 1976. After completing basic police training, he was posted as an Administrative Inspector at the Tuaran District Headquarters, Sabah. During his service period, he had served as Kudat District Police Chief, Sandakan District Police Chief, Kota Kinabalu Deputy District Police Chief, Seremban Deputy District Police Chief, Lahad Datu District Police Chief, Cheras District Police Chief, Dang Wangi District Police Chief.

He also served as Sabah Deputy Police Commissioner. On 2007, he was appointed as Director of Narcotics Criminal Investigation Department before become Director of Criminal Investigation Department on 2008 to 2013. Later, he was appointed as Deputy Inspector-General of Police. He was retired on 2014.

Honours
 :
 Officer of the Order of the Defender of the Realm (K.M.N.) (2001)
 Commander of the Order of Meritorious Service (P.J.N.) - Datuk (2012)
 Commander of the Order of Loyalty to the Crown of Malaysia (P.S.M.) - Tan Sri (2014)
 :
 Commander of the Order of Kinabalu (P.G.D.K.) - Datuk (2005)
 Grand Commander of the Order of Kinabalu (S.P.D.K.) - Datuk Seri Panglima (2014)
 :
 Grand Commander of the Order of the Territorial Crown (S.M.W.) - Datuk Seri (2009)
 :
 Knight Commander of the Order of the Loyalty to the Crown of Kelantan (D.P.S.K.) - Dato’ (2011)

References 

Malaysian police officers
1954 births
Officers of the Order of the Defender of the Realm
Commanders of the Order of Meritorious Service
Malaysian people of Malay descent
Commanders of the Order of Loyalty to the Crown of Malaysia
People from Sabah
Commanders of the Order of Kinabalu 
Grand Commanders of the Order of Kinabalu
Living people